The Austro-Hungarian Seventh Army was an Austro-Hungarian field army that fought during World War I.

Actions 
The Austro-Hungarian Seventh Army was formed in May 1915 and deployed on the Russian Front. It remained active there until it was disbanded in April 1918.

It participated in the 
 Gorlice–Tarnów Offensive (May-June 1915), 
 Great Retreat (June-September 1915)
 Brusilov Offensive (June-September 1916)
 Kerensky Offensive (July 1917)
 Operation Faustschlag (February-March 1918)

Commanders
 Karl von Pflanzer-Baltin : 8 May 1915 – 8 September 1916
 Karl Graf von Kirchbach auf Lauterbach : 8 September 1916 – 20 October 1916
 Hermann Kövess von Kövesshaza : 20 October 1916 – 16 January 1918
 Karl Kritek : 16 January 1918 – 15 April 1918

Sources 

 Austro-Hungarian Army, Higher Commands and Commanders 

Field armies of Austria-Hungary
1915 establishments in Austria-Hungary
1918 disestablishments in Austria-Hungary
Military units and formations established in 1915
Military units and formations disestablished in 1918